Tarmo Mitt (born 22 May 1977) is an Estonian professional strongman competitor and regular entrant to the World's Strongest Man competition. He was a finalist, finishing inside the top ten, in four consecutive years from 2005 to 2008.

Strongman career
Mitt was 20 when he started training and competing in strongman competitions and within 2 years had won his national championships. By 2005 he had become recognised as one of the world's leading competitors with podium finishes in the World Strongman Cup happening regularly. He was invited to the World's Strongest Man finals and made the final in 2005. Despite being in the WSM final on four consecutive occasions from 2005 to 2008, he did not make the starting line-up for the 2009 event, instead being given the first reserve spot. He counts this as his biggest disappointment whilst training as a strongman. In the 2007 final he tore his biceps and this led to his tenth place, although he was still in the final.

Tarmo won stage 3 of the WSF World Cup held in Minsk, Belarus on September 10, 2011. Tarmo also won the Estonian Tartu Strongman Open on November 27, 2010.
He is the father of prominent Estonian basketball player Arnold Mitt.

Personal records
Squat: 320 kg (704 lbs.)
Bench press : 225 kg (495 lbs.)
Deadlift : 335 kg (737 lbs.)
Hercules Hold : 1 11 12

References

External links

1977 births
Living people
Estonian strength athletes
Sportspeople from Tartu